José Segú Soriano (19 March 1935 – 25 July 2010) was a Spanish professional cyclist. He finished second in the 1959 Vuelta a España, and won the Vuelta a Andalucía in 1965.

Major results

1953
 1st Trofeo Jaumendreu
1954
 9th Trofeo Masferrer
1955
 3rd Overall Volta a la Comunitat Valenciana
 1st Stage 5
 3rd Overall Vuelta a Levante
1st Stage 5
1958
 1st Stage 5 Volta a Catalunya
1959
 1st Stage 2 Volta a Catalunya
 2nd Overall Vuelta a España
 9th Overall Critérium du Dauphiné Libéré
1st Stage 1
 9th Overall GP du Midi Libre
 9th Trofeo Masferrer
1960
 1st GP Ayutamiento de Bilbao
 1st Stage 8b Volta a Catalunya
 2nd Circuito de Getxo
 3rd GP Llodio
1961
 3rd Prueba Villafranca de Ordizia
 9th Overall Volta a Catalunya
 1st Stage 7b 
 9th Subida a Arrate
1962
 1st GP Pascuas
 1st Stage 17 Vuelta a España
 Vuelta a Andalucía
 1st Stages 1, 5, 6 & 8 
1963
 1st Stage 2 Vuelta a España
 1st Stage 3 Vuelta a La Rioja
 1st Stage 2 Grand Prix du Midi Libre
1964
 4th Trofeo Masferrer
 4th Overall Vuelta a Andalucía
 5th Mont Faron
1965
 1st  Overall Vuelta a Andalucía
1st Stage 3
 1st  Overall Vuelta a Guatemala
1st Stage 1

References

1935 births
2010 deaths
Spanish male cyclists
Spanish Vuelta a España stage winners
People from Vallès Oriental
Sportspeople from the Province of Barcelona
Cyclists from Catalonia
20th-century Spanish people